Stadion Banja Ilidža is a football stadium in Gradačac, Bosnia and Herzegovina. It is the home stadium of First League of FBiH club NK Zvijezda Gradačac. The stadium holds 5,000 spectators.

External links
Banja Iliža at Facebook

Football venues in Bosnia and Herzegovina